The 1947–48 Cupa României was the 11th edition of Romania's most prestigious football cup competition.

The title was won by ITA Arad against CFR Timișoara.

Format
The competition is an annual knockout tournament.

In the first round proper, two pots are made, the first pot with Divizia A teams and other teams until 16 and the second pot with the rest of teams qualified in this phase. First-pot teams will play away. Each tie is played as a single leg.

In the first round proper, if a match is drawn after 90 minutes, the game goes in extra time, and if the score is still tied after 120 minutes, the team from the lower league will qualify.

In the rest of the rounds, if a match is drawn after 90 minutes, the game goes in extra time, and if the score is still tied after 120 minutes, the team who plays away will qualify.

In case the teams are from same city, a replay will be played.

In case the teams play in the final, a replay will be played.

From the first edition, the teams from Divizia A entered in competition in sixteen finals, rule which remained until today.

First round proper

|colspan=3 style="background-color:#FFCCCC;"|16 March 1948

|-
|colspan=3 style="background-color:#FFCCCC;"|17 March 1948

|-
|colspan=3 style="background-color:#FFCCCC;"|18 March 1948

|-
|colspan=3 style="background-color:#FFCCCC;"|24 March 1948

|}

Second round proper

|colspan=3 style="background-color:#FFCCCC;"|21 April 1948

|}

Quarter-finals 

|colspan=3 style="background-color:#FFCCCC;"|30 May 1948

|-
|colspan=3 style="background-color:#FFCCCC;"|13 June 1948

|-
|colspan=3 style="background-color:#FFCCCC;"|24 June 1948

|-
|colspan=3 style="background-color:#FFCCCC;"|27 June 1948

|}

Semi-finals

|colspan=3 style="background-color:#FFCCCC;"|8 August 1948

|}

Final

References

External links
 romaniansoccer.ro
 Official site

Cupa României seasons
1947–48 in Romanian football
1947–48 domestic association football cups